Aurélie Marie Augustine Razafinjato is a Malagasy politician.  A member of the National Assembly of Madagascar, she was elected as an independent; she represents the constituency of Vohibato.

References
Profile on National Assembly site

Year of birth missing (living people)
Living people
Members of the National Assembly (Madagascar)
Malagasy women in politics
21st-century Malagasy women politicians
21st-century Malagasy politicians
Place of birth missing (living people)